is a railway station on the Aizu Railway Aizu Line in the town of Minamiaizu, Minamiaizu District, Fukushima Prefecture, Japan, operated by the Aizu Railway.

Lines

Station layout
Aizu-Tajima Station has two island platforms; however, platform 1 nearest the station building deadheads to a bay platform. Platforms 3 and 4 are connected by a footbridge.

Platforms

Adjacent stations

History
Aizu-Tajima Station opened on December 27, 1934.

Surrounding area
Minamiaizu Town Hall
Tajima Post Office

Bus routes
 Aizu Bus
[No.42] Aizu-Tajima Station - Minami Aizu Hospital - Haryu - Yamaguchi - Uchikawa
 Aizu-Tajima Station - Aizu-Shimogo Station - Yunokamionsen Station - Ōuchijuku - Konumazaki - Edamatsu
 Aizu-Tajima Station - Tajima Highschool
 Kaneko Kanko Bus
 Aizu-Tajima Station - Minami Aizu Hospital - Showa Onsen - Matsuyama (Suspension during winter due to heavy snow) 
Shizen Shuto・Tadami
 Aizu-Tajima Station - Minami Aizu Hospital - Kobayashi Snow Station -  Aizu Tadami Archaeological Museum - Ki no Sato YURARI - Tadami Junior Highschool - Tadami Station
A flat rate of fares at 1500 yen

In media 
The 4th episode of the TV series "Tetsu Ota Michiko, 20,000 km" is dedicated to this station

See also
 List of railway stations in Japan

References

External links

 Aizu Railway Station information 

Railway stations in Fukushima Prefecture
Aizu Line
Railway stations in Japan opened in 1934
Minamiaizu, Fukushima